This is a list of statewide public opinion polls that have been conducted relating to the 2020 United States presidential election. The persons named in the polls are declared candidates or have received media speculation about their possible candidacy.

If multiple versions of polls are provided, the version among likely voters is prioritized, then registered voters, then adults.

Polling aggregation in swing states 

The following graph depicts the difference between Joe Biden and Donald Trump in each swing state in the poll aggregators from March 2020 to the election, with the election results for comparison.

Alabama

Alaska

Arizona

Arkansas

California

Colorado

Connecticut

Delaware

District of Columbia

Florida

Georgia

Hawaii

Idaho

Illinois

Indiana

Iowa

Kansas

Kentucky

Louisiana

Maine

Maryland

Massachusetts

Michigan

Minnesota

Mississippi

Missouri

Montana

Nebraska

Nevada

New Hampshire

New Jersey

New Mexico

New York

North Carolina

North Dakota

Ohio

Oklahoma

Oregon

Pennsylvania

Rhode Island

South Carolina

South Dakota

Tennessee

Texas

Utah

Vermont

Virginia

Washington

West Virginia

Wisconsin

Wyoming

See also
Nationwide opinion polling for the 2020 United States presidential election
Nationwide opinion polling for the 2020 Democratic Party presidential primaries
Statewide opinion polling for the 2020 Democratic Party presidential primaries
Opinion polling for the 2020 Republican Party presidential primaries
2020 Democratic National Convention
2020 Republican National Convention

Notes
General footnotes

Partisan clients

External links
General election poll tracker from FiveThirtyEight